Mikkel Sjøberg Dencker (born 20 November 1975 in Frederiksberg) is a Danish politician, who was a member of the Folketing for the Danish People's Party from 2001 to 2019.

Political career
Dencker has been a member of the municipal council of Hvidovre Municipality since 1998, and has served as the municipality's deputy mayor. At the 2001 Danish general election, Dencker was elected into parliament. He was reelected in 2005, 2007, 2011 and 2015. He ran in the 2019 election but failed to win reelection, receiving 859 votes.

References

External links 
 Biography on the website of the Danish Parliament (Folketinget)

Living people
1975 births
People from Frederiksberg
Danish People's Party politicians
Danish municipal councillors
Members of the Folketing 2001–2005
Members of the Folketing 2005–2007
Members of the Folketing 2007–2011
Members of the Folketing 2011–2015
Members of the Folketing 2015–2019